Vartha Bharati also spelled as Vartha Bharathi is a prominent Kannada daily News paper (ಕನ್ನಡ ದಿನಪತ್ರಿಕೆ) published simultaneously from Bangalore , Mangalore and Shimoga. 
It was launched in August 2003. It is one of only 9 State level Kannada Daily newspapers of Karnataka, as recognized by the Information and Public Relations Department, Government of Karnataka. Its main focus was to provide voice and due representation to the deprived and marginalised sections of the society. Janapith and Padma Bhushan awardee Dr.U.R.Anantha Murthy was a great admirer and a regular contributor to this newspaper. Once, in a public meeting he called vartha bharati "The Guardian of Karnataka. The Guardian is the best and most honest newspaper of England, and has created a revolution in the whole of its nation. In the same way, Vartha Bharathi is Karnataka's Guardian," he lauded.
Abdussalam Puthige, the editor-in-chief of Varthabharati was inspired by veteran journalist Vaddarse Raghuram Shetty, who had launched Mungaru Kannada daily back in 1984. Mungaru was well known for its generous policy of providing fair representation to all castes, communities and sections of the society. It left a significant mark in the history of Kannada journalism by identifying and nurturing several talents from Dalit, Muslim, Christian and Backward Communities. Numerous well-known Kannada leftist, social activists and Dalit ideologues including U. R. Ananthamurthy, U. B. Banakar, Dr. Niranjan Aradhya, write regularly for the paper. In 2017, a Vartha Bharati journalist was detained and served a showcause notice by the Dakshina Kannada police. The notice was later stayed by the Karnataka High Court. In 2017, Vartha Bharati's social media page was blocked by Facebook. Though it was later restored, there was no clear explanation as to why it happened.

Special issues

 Karnataka Chief Minister Siddaramaiah  released the 14th annual issue of Vartha Bharati at his office on 13 October 2016
 Karnataka Chief Minister Siddaramaiah  released the 13th annual issue of Vartha Bharati at his office on 5 October 2015
 Karnataka Chief Minister Siddaramaiah  released the 12th annual issue of Vartha Bharati at his office on 12 October 2014
 10th anniversary special issue was released by Janapith laureate U. R. Ananthamurthy and the filmmaker Mahesh Bhatt in Mangalore during the Vartha Bharati reader's convention.
 11th anniversary special issue was released by the Chief Minister of Karnataka Siddaramaiah, U. R. Ananthamurthy and the former Editor-in-Chief of The Hindu, N. Ram in Bangalore.

Awards and accolades
 N. Ram, the former editor-in-chief of the Hindu, congratulated the daily for being a voice of the weaker section of the society for over a decade.
 Siddaramaiah commended Vartha Bharati for espousing the cause of all sections of society despite being a newspaper with a Muslim management.
 Mahesh Bhatt lauded Vartha Bharati by saying "Secularism is still alive in India, and we need to raise our voices against anti-secularists, just as Vartha Bharathi is doing. Vartha Bharathi has been doing what each Indian needs to do."
 Vartha Bharathi has been awarded by Karnataka chapter of the Transparency International India for its quality journalism.
 The book published by collecting the weekly column Bhoomi geete by the ecologist Dr. T.S. Vivekananda's won him the Karnataka Literature Academy Award for the year 2005.

Apps and Websites 
Website

Mobile Site

Android

ios app

See also
 Abdussalam Puthige
 Karnataka literature
 List of Kannada-language newspapers
 List of Kannada-language magazines
 List of newspapers in India
 Media in Karnataka
 Media of India

References

External links
 The Muslim Kannadiga
 Karnataka Government Information Department
 Too few Dalits in media: Ram

Kannada-language newspapers
Mass media in Mangalore
Newspapers published in Bangalore
Publications established in 2003
2003 establishments in Karnataka